Assumption, in Christianity, refers to the Assumption of Mary, a belief in the taking up of the Virgin Mary into heaven.

Assumption may also refer to:

Places
 Assumption, Alberta, Canada
 Assumption, Illinois, United States
 Assumption Township, Christian County, Illinois
 Assumption Island, Seychelles
 Assumption Island Airport
 Assumption, Minnesota, United States
 Assumption, Nebraska, United States
 Assumption, Ohio, United States
 Assumption Parish, Louisiana, United States

Arts, entertainment, and media
 "Assumption" (short story), a 1929 story by Samuel Beckett
 Assumption of Moses, a Jewish apocryphal pseudepigraphical work of uncertain date and authorship

Churches
 Assumption Chapel, Minnesota, United States
 Assumption of the Blessed Virgin Mary Church, Michigan, United States
 Assumption – St. Paul, New York, United States
 Cathedral of the Assumption (disambiguation)
 Church of the Assumption (disambiguation)

Logic
 Closed-world assumption, the presumption that a statement that is true is also known to be true, and a statement not known to be true is false
 Open-world assumption, assumption that the truth value of a statement may be true irrespective of whether or not it is known to be true
 Tacit assumption, belief applied in developing a logical argument or decision that is not explicitly voiced nor necessarily understood by the decision maker
 Presupposition, a tacit assumption about the world or background belief relating to an utterance
 Unique name assumption, in logics where different names always refer to different entities in the world

Schools

Australia
 Assumption College, Kilmore, Victoria
 Assumption College, Warwick, Queensland

Canada
 Assumption Catholic Secondary School, Burlington, Ontario
 Assumption College School, Windsor, Ontario
 Assumption College School (Brantford), Ontario
 Assumption University (Windsor, Ontario)

India
 Assumption College, Changanasserry, Kerala

Japan
 Assumption Junior College, Osaka Prefecture

Philippines
 Assumption Antipolo
 Assumption College of Davao, Davao City
 Assumption College San Lorenzo, Makati City
 Assumption Iloilo, Iloilo City
 University of the Assumption, Pampanga

Singapore
 Assumption English School

Thailand
 Assumption College Sriracha, Chonburi Province
 Assumption College (Thailand)
 Assumption University (Thailand), Bangkok

UK (Northern Ireland)
 Assumption Grammar School, Ballynahinch, County Down, Northern Ireland

United States
 Academy of the Assumption, Florida
 Assumption Catholic School, Roman Catholic Archdiocese of Galveston–Houston
 Assumption College, Massachusetts
 Assumption College for Sisters, New Jersey
 Assumption High School (Iowa)
 Assumption High School (Kentucky)
 Assumption High School (Louisiana)
 Assumption High School (Wisconsin)
 Assumption Preparatory School, Massachusetts
 Assumption School, Illinois
 Assumption School (Saint Paul, Minnesota)

See also
 Dormition (disambiguation)
 Asunción, the Spanish word
 Axiom
 Assumption Cathedral (disambiguation)
 Church of the Assumption (disambiguation)
 Debt Assumption, the US policy under Alexander Hamilton to assume the war debt of some states
 Entering heaven alive
 L'Assomption River, Quebec, Canada
 List of churches consecrated to Santa Maria Assunta ("Assunta" is the Italian for Assumption)
 Presupposition
 Proposition